Karim Darwish (born 29 August 1981) is an Egyptian squash player.

Career overview
As a junior player, he won the World Junior Championship title in 2000, and the British Junior Open title in 1999.

Earlier in 2008, Darwish finished runner-up at the World Open, losing in the final to fellow Egyptian player Ramy Ashour (11–5, 8–11, 4–11, 5–11). Darwish displaced Amr Shabana to claim the world number 1 position after winning the prestigious 2008 Saudi International and 3 major titles (including the Qatar Classic) in 2008.
 
Darwish competed in the J.P. Morgan T.O.C, only to lose to Daryl Selby in round 1. In the Case Swedish Open in 2012, Darwish placed 2nd after losing to Grégory Gaultier in the final. Darwish managed to beat Mohamed El Shorbagy in five games at the Macau Open 2012.

Personal life
Darwish is married to fellow squash player Engy Kheirallah.

World Open final appearances

0 title & 1 runner-up

Major World Series final appearances

Hong Kong Open: 1 final (0 title, 1 runner-up)

Qatar Classic: 3 finals (2 titles, 1 runner-up)

See also
 Official Men's Squash World Ranking

References

External links 

 
 
 
 Page at Squashpics.com
 "Karim Darwish Retires"

Egyptian male squash players
1981 births
Living people
African Games gold medalists for Egypt
African Games medalists in squash
Competitors at the 2003 All-Africa Games
Competitors at the 2005 World Games
21st-century Egyptian people